Mitchell Francis "Mike" Balas (May 9, 1910 – October 15, 1996) was a Major League Baseball pitcher who appeared in one game in with the Boston Bees in 1938.

Balas entered professional baseball in 1929 playing for the Brockton Shoemakers of the New England League. After moving around the minors for the next 9 years, he played in his only MLB game on April 27, 1938. In that game, he pitched 1 innings facing 8 batters, surrendering 3 runs (1 earned), walking and striking out none. Following the game he returned to the minors and continued there until 1940. He also was a minor league manager from 1945 to 1948.

Balas was a Jehovah's Witness and in 1942 was prosecuted in the United States District Court for the District of Massachusetts for failing to report to a conscientious objector camp during World War II. He was sentenced by Judge George Clinton Sweeney to three years in prison.

References

External links

1910 births
1996 deaths
Major League Baseball pitchers
Baseball players from Massachusetts
Boston Bees players
Sportspeople from Lowell, Massachusetts
American Jehovah's Witnesses
American conscientious objectors
Binghamton Triplets players
Birmingham Barons players
Bridgeport Bears (baseball) players
Brockton Shoemakers players
Dayton Ducks players
Elmira Pioneers players
Erie Sailors players
Hartford Laurels players
Indianapolis Indians players
Richmond Colts players
Scranton Miners players
York White Roses players
American sportspeople convicted of crimes